The Women's giant slalom competition of the Innsbruck 1976 Olympics was held at Axamer Lizum on Friday, 13 February.

The defending world champion was Fabienne Serrat of France, while Austria's Annemarie Moser-Pröll was the defending World Cup giant slalom champion and Switzerland's Lise-Marie Morerod led the 1976 World Cup.

Results

References 

Women's giant slalom
Oly
Women's giant slalom